David Dirrane Bowes (born in Boston, Massachusetts in 1957) is an American painter, based in Turin, Italy. He was first recognized for his paintings during the early 1980s in New York's East Village.

Biography
Born in 1957 to Katherine "Kae" (née Dirrane) and John S. Bowes. He is a brother of science fiction writer Richard Bowes. Bowes attended Rhode Island School of Design (RISD) in the mid 1970s and has taught painting classes at his alma mater.

His paintings are often brightly colored, with loose painterly strokes and make reference to multiple sources such as allegories, mythology and art history. He has been described as being a "brilliant painter", and having a "delicacy of touch and genuine fascination with the medium of paint."

Bowes' work is exhibited in the United States and Europe. He participated in 1999 at the 48th Venice Biennale and one of his works is present in the Lucio Amelio's Terrae Motus collection at the Royal Palace of Caserta starting in 1994. His work is held in various public museum collection, including the Walker Art Center, Portland Art Museum, the Broad Contemporary Art Museum at LACMA, among others.

References

External links
David Bowes work on Artnet.com

1957 births
Living people
20th-century American painters
American male painters
American expatriates in Italy
21st-century American painters
21st-century American male artists
Artists from Boston
Rhode Island School of Design alumni
Rhode Island School of Design faculty
People from the East Village, Manhattan
20th-century American male artists